Sir John Swynnerton (died 8 December 1616) was an English politician who sat in the House of Commons  between 1601 and 1611. He was Lord Mayor of London in 1612.

He was born the son of John Swynnerton of Dudleston, Shropshire.

Swynnerton was a member of the Worshipful Company of Merchant Taylors. In 1601, he was elected Member of Parliament for Petersfield. He was elected alderman of the City of London for Cripplegate ward on 22 June 1602 and was Sheriff of London from 1602 to 1603. He was knighted on 26 July 1603.  

In 1604, he was elected MP for East Grinstead  and sat until 1611. From 1606 to 1607 he was Master of the Merchant Taylors Company.  He was elected Lord Mayor of London in 1612. In 1616 he was colonel in the South Regiment Trained Bands.

On his death in 1616 he was buried at St Mary Aldermanbury.

References

 

Year of birth missing
1616 deaths
Sheriffs of the City of London
17th-century lord mayors of London
English MPs 1601
English MPs 1604–1611